Aboriginal Law may refer to

Canadian Aboriginal law
Customary law in Australia
Aboriginal title in the United States